Ho ho ho is onomatopoeia for laughter, sometimes associated with Santa Claus.

Ho ho ho may also refer to:

Ho Ho Ho (film), a 2009 Romanian film

Music
Ho Ho Ho (album), a Christmas album by RuPaul
"Ho Ho Ho", song by Orange Range from their "Kizuna" single
"Ho Ho Ho", song by Sia from Everyday Is Christmas
"Ho Ho Ho", song by Liz Phair 
"Ho Ho Ho", song by Fischer-Z from Fish's Head
"Ho Ho Ho", song by the Chipmunks from Undeniable
"Ho! Ho! Ho! (Who'd Be a Turkey at Christmas)", song by Elton John from Lady Samantha

See also
Hoohoo (disambiguation)
Haha (disambiguation)
"Ho, Ho, Ho, We Say Hey, Hey, Hey", a 2008 single from Merzedes Club
Yo Ho Ho, a 1981 Bulgarian drama film